Asim Ferhatović "Hase" (24 January 1933 – 25 January 1987) was a Bosnian professional footballer who played as a striker.

He started his football career in 1948 with hometown club FK Sarajevo, for whom he made his first-team debut in 1952. Ferhatović remained with the club until his retirement in 1967, although he represented Fenerbahçe in the 1962–63 Turkish league season. He won a solitary cap for the Yugoslavia national team in 1961.

Club career
During the 1950s and 1960s, Ferhatović led FK Sarajevo to great heights, and became the club's best and most famous player, scoring 198 goals in 422 games. He also had a short stint at Fenerbahçe where he played only seven league games and scored one goal. After only half a season he left Fenerbahçe and went back to Sarajevo. His greatest personal achievement was becoming the lead scorer in the Yugoslav First League with 19 goals for FK Sarajevo in the 1963–64 season. His last season, (1966–67) saw Sarajevo win their first-ever First League title and qualify for the European Cup.

Ferhatović's retirement was one of the most important events in Sarajevo's sporting history, and the local newspapers ran the headline Jedan je Hase! (There is Only One Hase!) in his honour that day.

International career
Ferhatović played once for the Yugoslavia national team, on 8 October 1961 against South Korea in a qualification match for the 1962 FIFA World Cup.

Death and legacy
Ferhatović died on 25 January 1987, the day after his 54th birthday, of a heart attack.

Sarajevo's Asim Ferhatović Hase Stadium, the site of the Opening Ceremonies of the 1984 Winter Olympics and the home of FK Sarajevo, is named in his honour. The Bosnia and Herzegovina national team often used the stadium for their international matches in the past. It is also the largest stadium in Bosnia and Herzegovina.

In popular culture
The Bosnian rock band Zabranjeno Pušenje wrote a song in honour of Ferhatović called Nedjelja kad je otišao Hase ("The Sunday When Hase Left") and was included in their 1985 album Dok čekaš sabah sa šejtanom.

Honours

Player
Sarajevo 
Yugoslav First League: 1966–67

Individual
Yugoslav First League top goalscorer: 1963–64 (19 goals)

References

External links

1933 births
1987 deaths
Footballers from Sarajevo
Association football forwards
Yugoslav footballers
Yugoslavia international footballers
FK Sarajevo players
Fenerbahçe S.K. footballers
Yugoslav First League players
Yugoslav expatriate footballers
Expatriate footballers in Turkey
Yugoslav expatriate sportspeople in Turkey